Boża Wola may refer to the following places:
Boża Wola, Łódź Voivodeship (central Poland)
Boża Wola, Lublin County in Lublin Voivodeship (east Poland)
Boża Wola, Zamość County in Lublin Voivodeship (east Poland)
Boża Wola, Lesser Poland Voivodeship (south Poland)
Boża Wola, Subcarpathian Voivodeship (south-east Poland)
Boża Wola, Świętokrzyskie Voivodeship (south-central Poland)
Boża Wola, Grodzisk Mazowiecki County in Masovian Voivodeship (east-central Poland)
Boża Wola, Legionowo County in Masovian Voivodeship (east-central Poland)
Boża Wola, Mińsk County in Masovian Voivodeship (east-central Poland)
Boża Wola, Radom County in Masovian Voivodeship (east-central Poland)
Boża Wola, Greater Poland Voivodeship (west-central Poland)